"Feel So Close" is a song by Scottish DJ Calvin Harris, released as the second single from his third studio album, 18 Months (2012). In order to have lyrics and be standalone, Harris had to return to singing on this song, after previously stating he had stopped singing in concerts. The song debuted at number two on the UK Singles Chart, becoming Harris's sixth solo top ten single. It also marked his second single to chart on the Billboard Hot 100 in the United States—his first being Rihanna's "We Found Love", on which he is featured. The song had sold over 2.17 million copies in the US by the end of 2012.

Background
Harris shared the story behind "Feel So Close" on 19 August 2021, the tenth anniversary of the song's release.

"I like remembering how it came about, cos at the time I was well confused about what to do with my life/career. At the end of summer 2010 I had played my last gig (Creamfields) with my 'band' and had done enough 'DJ set' gigs to know that I wanted to change the way my music was presented. I needed to stop singing every song as I had all these ideas for female singers and my falsetto just wasn't going to cut it.

So I began producing with a new purpose, excited I could give my songs to real singers and finally move closer to the role I had always dreamt of in music (weird dude in the background who never speaks).

After about 3 months of studio, I visited my record label Columbia and played them Awooga, Bounce and another ok song with a feature that ended up not coming out. The response from the label was overwhelmingly lukewarm; I came out of the meeting wondering if I had made the right decision in changing my path. That's putting it lightly actually I was gutted and my head was spinning, I thought I'd absolutely fucked it. So immediately I headed back to my studio room feeling properly sad but also enough 'fuck it I'll show em I"ll sing on one then, and it'll be class' and made Feel So Close in a few hours."

Critical reception
Robert Copsey of Digital Spy gave the song four out of five stars writing: "'I feel so close to you right now/ It's a force field', he sing-speaks in a clumsy but infatuated manner over melancholic piano chords, before a breezy, lyric-less chorus of squawking electronic sirens and crazy synths bound around like a bucking bronco at a Texas rodeo rave. The result is a wistful yet exhilarating club thumper—and as for those vocals, well, if you want something done right..."

Music video
The music video for "Feel So Close", directed by Vincent Haycock, premiered on Harris's official YouTube channel on 14 July 2011. As well as depicting Harris watching and sitting with a girl, it also shows various groups of youths dancing, as was the theme of the previous video. It also features the rancher cowboy and his horse, who are featured on the single cover. It was filmed in and around Kern County, California. The truck stop scene was filmed at Astro Burgers, Boron adjacent to Reyes Polish—now Reyes Truck Polishing—in Kramer Junction in San Bernardino County, California; the suburban scene at the intersection of Clark and Lapis Streets, in Rosamond, California; the desert town scene in Randsburg, California.

In popular culture
"Feel So Close" was featured on the series The Secret Circle and The Vampire Diaries, the video game Guitar Hero Live and the trailer to the film Parental Guidance. The song was used for montages on episodes of RTÉ's League of Ireland highlight show Monday Night Soccer in the 2012 season.

In 2013, YouTube star Kurt Hugo Schneider and Coca-Cola teamed up to create music videos featuring creative covers of two 2011 hits namely "Feel So Close" and Of Monsters and Men's "Little Talks" for a campaign called "The Sounds of AHH". "Feel So Close" shows Schneider playing only Coca-Cola bottles, glasses and cans. In the version, he is accompanied by beatboxing cellist Kevin Olusola. Commercial edits of the video aired on season 13 premiere of American Idol on 14 January 2014 on FOX.

The song is also featured in commercials for the Samsung Galaxy S5.
It was also featured in the soundtrack to The Inbetweeners Movie.

Track listings

Charts

Weekly charts

Year-end charts

Certifications

Release history

References

External links
 

2011 singles
2011 songs
Calvin Harris songs
Columbia Records singles
Songs written by Calvin Harris
Number-one singles in Scotland